Samuel Dickinson Crooks (16 January 1908 – 3 February 1981) was an English footballer who played as outside forward or outside right for Derby County in the mid-war era. He was one of the best-known footballers of the 1920s and 1930s and was capped 26 times by England.

Early life
Crooks was born at Bearpark, County Durham, one of a family of 17 children. After leaving school, he worked in the coal-mines and played for the colliery team and then for Tow Law Town in his spare time until problems with rheumatism forced him to abandon his career underground. When his health was restored he joined Durham City in June 1926 and made 16 appearances for them in the Third Division (North).

Derby County and England
By April 1927, he had been spotted by George Jobey and was signed for Derby County for a fee of £300, making his debut for The Rams in a 2–1 win over Leicester City on 10 September 1927. Between 1927 and 1946 he played 445 games for the Rams, scoring 111 goals. During this period, County were twice runners-up in the Football League, in 1930 and 1936.

His first appearance for England was in a 5–2 victory against Scotland on 5 April 1930. He then became a regular fixture in the England side, making 26 appearances and scoring 7 goals, including two in a 7–1 defeat of Spain on 9 December 1931. His final England appearance came in a 6–2 victory over Hungary on 2 December 1936, (playing alongside Derby County colleagues Raich Carter and Eric Keen).

In 1935, Arsenal attempted to sign Crooks and Tom Cooper in exchange for Alex James, but the deal fell through as Arsenal required a cash payment as well which Derby were not prepared to meet.

Crook's playing career was interrupted by World War II, but he made a handful of league appearances in the 1946–47 season before retiring. He was unlucky to miss Derby's FA Cup win of 1946 due to a knee injury, having scored in all of the earlier rounds.

Management

In December 1949, Crooks moved into management with Retford Town.

In May 1950 he became manager of Shrewsbury Town, who had been elected to the Football League Division Three North for the 1950–51 season. He remained with the Shropshire side until 1954.

In 1954 he moved to Gresley Rovers turning out occasionally as a player, making his début on Boxing Day 1954 in the Birmingham & District League at Burton Albion. There followed spells as manager with Burton Albion and Heanor Town. During this time he opened a sport clothing store in Derby.

After finishing in local team management he became Derby County's Chief Scout (until 1967) and also served for 14 years as Secretary of the Association Football Players Union.

His career has been marked by Durham City naming the upper lounge at New Ferens Park, 'The Sammy Crooks Lounge', which is home to some of the memorabilia from his playing career. Similarly, Belper Leisure Centre, situated in the town where he died, renamed the bar to 'The Sammy Crooks Suite'.

References

 Mortimer, Gerald (2004): The Who's Who of Derby County. Breedon Books Publishing, Derby. 
 Mortimer, Gerald (2006): Derby County – The Complete Record. Breedon Books Publishing, Derby. 
 Official matchday programme: Burton Albion v Gresley Rovers 26/12/54.

External links
Profile at www.Englandfc.com

1908 births
1981 deaths
Footballers from County Durham
English footballers
Association football wingers
England international footballers
Tow Law Town F.C. players
Durham City A.F.C. players
Derby County F.C. players
English Football League players
English Football League representative players
English football managers
Retford Town F.C. managers
Shrewsbury Town F.C. managers
Gresley F.C. managers
Burton Albion F.C. managers
Heanor Town F.C. managers
People from Bearpark